Colmán Rímid (or Colmán mac Báetáin) (died 604) was an Irish king who is included in some lists as a High King of Ireland. Colmán was the son of Báetán mac Muirchertaig (died 572), also considered to be a high king, and belonged to the Cenél nEógain branch of the northern Uí Néill. He ruled in Ailech from 578 to 602.<ref>he is given a reign of 24 years in the Laud Synchronisms</ref>   His byname rímid means "the Counter", suggesting that he was numerate, unlike most contemporary kings.
 
The high kingship of Ireland rotated between the Cenél nEógain and Cenél Conaill branches in the late 6th century. He is said to have shared the High Kingship with Áed Sláine. The accession of Colmán and Áed to the high kingship is recorded in the annals in 598. They are also listed as kings in the king lists. They are however omitted from the earliest king list, the Baile Chuind (The Ecstasy of Conn), a late 7th-century Irish poem.  Fiachnae mac Báetáin of Ulaid may have been effectively king.

In 602 Colmán defeated his Cenél Conaill rival, Conall Cú mac Áedo (died 604) at the Battle of Cúl Sleamna (in Raphoe barony) and Conall was put to flight. Colmán met his death in 604 when he was killed by a kinsman, Lochán Dilmana. The Annals of Ulster state of this:Of what value kingship, of what value law; of what value power over princes; Since it is king Colmán the Counter whom Lochan Dithnadha has slain?

His daughter, or perhaps granddaughter, Fín, was the mother of Aldfrith son of Oswiu. The poet Cenn Fáelad mac Aillila (died 679) was his nephew.
His brother Máel Umai (died 610) fought at the Battle of Degsastan where he is said to have killed the brother of King Æthelfrith of Bernicia.

Notes

References 

 Annals of Ulster at CELT: Corpus of Electronic Texts at University College Cork
 Annals of Tigernach at CELT: Corpus of Electronic Texts at University College Cork
 Charles-Edwards, T.M., Early Christian Ireland.'' Cambridge University Press, Cambridge, 2000. 
 Byrne, Francis John (2001), Irish Kings and High-Kings, Dublin: Four Courts Press, 
 

604 deaths
7th-century Irish monarchs
High Kings of Ireland
Kings of Ailech
6th-century Irish monarchs
Year of birth unknown